The 1937 Tasmanian state election was held on 20 February 1937 in the Australian state of Tasmania to elect 30 members of the Tasmanian House of Assembly. The election used the Hare-Clark proportional representation system — six members were elected from each of five electorates.

The incumbent Labor government was led by Albert Ogilvie. The opposition Nationalist Party was led by Henry Baker.

Labor had a decisive win in the 1937 election, one that would see the Nationalist Party (later to become the Liberal Party) in opposition until 1969.

Results

|}

Distribution of votes

Primary vote by division

Distribution of seats

See also
 Members of the Tasmanian House of Assembly, 1937–1941
 Candidates of the 1937 Tasmanian state election

References

External links
Assembly Election Results, 1937, Parliament of Tasmania.
Report on General Election, 1937, Tasmanian Electoral Commission.

Elections in Tasmania
1937 elections in Australia
1930s in Tasmania
February 1937 events